Table tennis at the 2015 European Games in Baku took place from 13 to 19 June 2015 at Baku Sports Hall. 126 athletes, 63 men and 63 women, competed in four events.

Qualification

2016 Summer Olympics
Organisers confirmed that the winners of the men's and women's singles events will qualify automatically for those events at the 2016 Summer Olympics.

Medalists

Medal table

Participating nations
A total of 126 athletes from 34 nations competed in table tennis at the 2015 European Games.

References

 
Sports at the 2015 European Games
2015 in table tennis
2015